Anuyskoye is a rural locality (a selo) and the administrative center of Anuysky Selsoviet, Smolensky District, Altai Krai, Russia. The population was 844 as of 2013. There are 14 streets.

Geography 
Anuyskoye is located 17 km west of Smolenskoye (the district's administrative centre) by road. Starotyryshkino is the nearest rural locality.

References 

Rural localities in Smolensky District, Altai Krai